Eilema bifasciata is a moth of the  subfamily Arctiinae. It is found in the Democratic Republic of Congo, Mozambique and South Africa.

References

bifasciata
Lepidoptera of the Democratic Republic of the Congo
Lepidoptera of Mozambique
Moths of Sub-Saharan Africa
Lepidoptera of South Africa